Joby is a given name, sometimes a short form (hypocorism) of Joseph. Notable people with the name include:

Joby Baker (born 1934), Canadian born actor and painter
Joby Godfrey (1894–1977), English professional footballer
Joby Harold, English film director and screenwriter currently living in Los Angeles
Joby Harris (born 1975), California-based visual artist; guitar player and singer for band Crash Rickshaw
Joby Harte, British television personality
Joby Ingram-Dodd (born 1980), former Welsh racing cyclist
Joby Messier (born 1970), professional ice hockey player
Joby Ogwyn (born 1974), American mountain climber from Santa Barbara, California
Joby Talbot (born 1971), British composer
Joby Wright (born 1950), American former college and professional basketball player

See also 
 Jobi (disambiguation)
 Jobe (disambiguation)

Masculine given names
Lists of people by nickname
Hypocorisms